North Shore Fishing Lake is a hamlet in the Rural Municipality of Sasman No. 336, Saskatchewan, Canada. Listed as a designated place by Statistics Canada, the hamlet had a population of 50 in the Canada 2016 Census. It is located on the north-eastern shore of Fishing Lake.

Demographics 

See also 
 List of communities in Saskatchewan
 Hamlets of Saskatchewan
 Designated place

References

Sasman No. 336, Saskatchewan
Designated places in Saskatchewan
Organized hamlets in Saskatchewan
Division No. 10, Saskatchewan